The 2019 European Shotgun Championships was the 51st edition of the global shotgun competition, European Shotgun Championships, organised by the European Shooting Confederation.

Senior events

Men

Women

Mixed

Junior events

Men

Women

Mixed

Medal table

See also
 2019 European Shooting Championships
 European Shooting Confederation
 International Shooting Sport Federation

References

External links
 
 Results Book 

European Shooting Championships
European Shotgun Championships